Novem may refer to:

 Novem, a brand name for the drug meloxicam
 NOVEM, a 2006 American film
 Novem., abbreviation for November